Mattia Tordini (born 22 June 2002) is an Italian professional footballer who plays as a forward for  club Lecco.

Club career
Born in Novara, Tordini was formed on Internazionale, Novara and Torino youth system. He joined permanently to Novara, and made his senior debut on 4 October 2020 against Lucchese for Serie C.

On 11 August 2021, Tordini signed for Lecco.

References

External links
 
 

2002 births
Living people
People from Novara
Footballers from Piedmont
Italian footballers
Association football forwards
Serie C players
Novara F.C. players
Calcio Lecco 1912 players
Sportspeople from the Province of Novara